The Smart Border Declaration was a binational deal signed on December 12, 2001, between the United States and Canada. The aim of the plan was to continually improve border security, information sharing, infrastructure protection, and law enforcement co-operation between the two nations.

The Smart Border Declaration included a four-part Action Plan. Within a year, the Smart Border Declaration was expanded into a 30-point Action Plan.

See also
NEXUS program

References

Canada–United States relations